Charles Elmer Ponder (June 26, 1893 – April 20, 1974) was a professional baseball player.  Known as "Elmer Ponder", he was a right-handed major league pitcher (1917, 1919–21) with the Pittsburgh Pirates and Chicago Cubs. With the Pittsburgh Pirates, he pitched a perfect 5 2/3 innings of relief in his first outing of the year, against the Philadelphia Phillies in the first game of a doubleheader on July 23rd; it would be 94 years until another member of the Pirates, Vin Mazzaro, threw as many as 5 perfect innings of relief, in 2013. In 1920, Ponder appeared in 33 games, with a record of 11–15. His ERA of 2.62, while not the best on the squad, was better than the team ERA of 2.89. He was an aviator and airplane mechanic in World War I in 1917 until the end of the war, and he returned to the Pirates a war hero.

In 1921, he was doing well with an ERA of 2.19 in 24 2/3 innings, when he was traded to the Chicago Cubs. His ERA with them went up to 4.74. He was of Cherokee descent and played with other famous "Indian players" of his generation such as Ben Shaw, Moses Yellow Horse, Bill Marriot and Virgil Cheeves. He joined the Allied Forces in World War I and served for the U.S. when the Americans joined the war. For Elmer Ponder's baseball career, he compiled a 17–27 record, with a 3.21 earned run average, and 113 strikeouts in 378⅔ innings pitched. Ponder recalled playing an exhibition game in Cuba with Babe Ruth as being a post-career highlight, along with his providing financing to former Indian ball players from his self started Ponder Finance company, during a time banks would not provide financing to minorities. His father had owned a bank in Magnum, OK.

An alumnus of the University of Oklahoma, where he was a captain and second baseman, Ponder was born in Reed, Oklahoma. He married silent film organist, Zelpha Gledhill, in San Diego, and they had two children. Elmer Ponder had a successful automobile and finance company in Albuquerque, New Mexico and he lived there with his wife, Zelpha, until his death at the age of 80.

External links

1893 births
1974 deaths
Pittsburgh Pirates players
Chicago Cubs players
Cincinnati Reds players
Major League Baseball pitchers
Baseball players from Oklahoma
Dallas Giants players
Grand Rapids Champs players
San Antonio Bronchos players
Birmingham Barons players
Los Angeles Angels (minor league) players
Salt Lake City Bees players
Portland Beavers players
University of Oklahoma alumni